Pfitzner is a German surname. Notable people with the surname include:

 Alexander Pfitzner (1880–1910), Hungarian-American engineer, designer and aviation pioneer
Alfred Pfitzner (1875–1948) German painter
 Bernice Pfitzner (born 1938), Australian politician
 Gavin Pfitzner (born 1966), Australian tennis player
 Hans Pfitzner (1869–1949), German composer
 Josef Pfitzner (1901–1945), German politician
 Marc Pfitzner (born 1984), German footballer
 Kurt Pfitzner (born 1958), United States Air Force Colonel

German-language surnames